Widow's weeds can refer to:
 Widow's Weeds (Tristania album), an album by the Norwegian gothic metal band, Tristania.
 Widow's Weeds (Silversun Pickups album), an album by American alternative rock band, Silversun Pickups.
 Clothes worn by a widow during a period of mourning for her spouse (from the Old English "Waed" meaning "garment")